Striped black crow is a common name shared by three species of butterflies in the genus Euploea:

Euploea alcathoe
Euploea doubledayi
Euploea eyndhovii